= Konstantin Chlaidze =

Georgian film director

- Born: Konstantin Chlaidze; Tbilisi, Georgia
- Occupations: Film director, cinematographer
- Years active: 2003 – present
- Notable work: Mirza’s Birthday (2011)

Konstantin (Kote) Chlaidze (Georgian: კონსტანტინე ჩლაიძე; born 1973) is a Georgian film director.

== Biography ==
Konstantin (Kote) Chlaidze was born January 31, 1973, in Tbilisi, Georgia, in a family of the composer George (Gogi) Chlaidze.

He is a graduate of the Georgian State Institute of Cinema and Theatre (1995).

During 1996-98 he was the head of television crew for the educational system public support program. During those two years he also took the advanced film direction course.

Konstantin Chlaidze worked as a director for TBC TV during 1998-2000 and held the same position on the 9th channel during 2002–2004. He have worked at the Georgian National Film Center since 2005, on the following positions:

• 2005-2008 - Deputy director

• 2008-2010 – Director

• 2010-2014 – Head of Department at Film Commission

• 2014 – Director for Regional Projects

In 2010 he was an initiator and co-author of ‘Development Strategy of Georgian film’.

== Filmography ==
=== In Development ===
- Khvedri (The Lot)

=== Producer ===
- Ramaz Chkhikvadze (Full-length documentary), Directed by Aleksandre Rekhviashvili, 2013
- My City, Series of television programs, TV network Artarea, 2014

=== Director ===
- The Bet, 2 minutes, 2002
- Mirza's Birthday, 8 minutes, 2011

=== Screenwriter ===
- The Bet, 2 minutes, 2002
- Mirza's Birthday, 8 minutes, 2011

=== Cinematographer ===
- Mirza's Birthday, (2011)
